John Two Guns White Calf (also known as John Two Guns and John Whitecalf Two Guns) (1872–1934) was a chief of the Piegan Blackfeet in Montana. He was born near Fort Benton, Montana and was the adopted son of Chief White Calf. After the elder White Calf died in 1902, White Calf became the last chief of the Blackfoot Tribe. He died of pneumonia at the age of 63 and is buried in a Catholic cemetery in Browning, Montana.

Promotional career 
He became famous for his work promoting the Glacier National Park for the Great Northern Railway. In 1912, he travelled with several other Blackfeet to the 1912 United States Land Show in Chicago to make what was possibly the first publicity trip for the tribe. He also claimed to be the model for the profile on the Indian head nickel. However, the sculptor, James Earle Fraser, said that the image he used was a composite of several people.

Washington Redskins 
In 1971, Walter Wetzel ,a tribal Blackfeet council member, created the Washington Redskins logo. He used Two Guns White Calf's image as the basis for the logo. Controversy caused the team to change the logo in 2020. The team officially change their name to The Washington Commanders in 2022.

References

Piegan Blackfeet people
Members of the Methodist Episcopal Church
Deaths from pneumonia
1872 births
1934 deaths